Cuerna is a genus of sharpshooters in the family Cicadellidae. There are 26 species in this genus. They can be found in North America from Canada and Alaska to Panama, but the highest diversity of species is in the southwestern United States.

Species
Cuerna alba
Cuerna alpina
Cuerna alta
Cuerna angusta
Cuerna arida
Cuerna balli
Cuerna costalis
Cuerna curvata
Cuerna emeljanovi
Cuerna fenestella
Cuerna gladiola
Cuerna hasbroucki
Cuerna kaloostiani
Cuerna krameri
Cuerna lyrifora
Cuerna mexicana
Cuerna oaxacensis
Cuerna obesa
Cuerna obtusa
Cuerna occidentalis
Cuerna sayi
Cuerna semibulba
Cuerna stitti
Cuerna striata
Cuerna unica
Cuerna yuccae

References

External links
 Cuerna at 3I Interactive Key and Database]

Hemiptera of North America
Cicadellidae genera
Proconiini